"I Like Them Girls" is a song by American singer Tyrese Gibson. It was written by Harvey Mason, Jr., Damon Thomas, Phillip "Silky" White, and J. Valentine for Gibson's second album 2000 Watts (2001), while production was helmed by Mason and Thomas under their production moniker The Underdogs. The song served as the first single from the album and reached number 48 on the US Billboard Hot 100 and number 15 on the US Hot R&B/Hip-Hop Songs chart.

Track listings

Credits and personnel

 George Evans – guitar
 Tyrese Gibson – vocals, writer
 Jean-Marie Horvat – mixing
 Harvey Mason, Jr. – producer, writer

 Christian "Tian" Slayer – vocal editing
 Damon Thomas – producer, writer
 Phillip "Sky" White – writer
 J. Valentine – backing vocals, writer

Charts

Weekly charts

Year-end charts

References

2001 songs
Tyrese Gibson songs
2001 singles
RCA Records singles
Songs written by Damon Thomas (record producer)
Songs written by Harvey Mason Jr.
Songs written by J. Valentine